Heteromicta tripartitella is a species of snout moth in the genus Heteromicta. It was described by Edward Meyrick in 1879. It is found in Australia (including Queensland and New South Wales).

References

Moths described in 1879
Tirathabini